Pierre Christian Bellanger (born December 14, 1958) is founder and CEO of radio station Skyrock, and founder of Skyrock.com (French-language social network).

Biography 
Bellanger created Skyrock in 1985 as a national FM station in France. Today, it ranks as the country's most popular radio station among 13- to 24-year-olds, with four million listeners each day.

As a biology student in late 1970s Paris, Bellanger participated in the free radio movement that helped to topple the state's monopoly on broadcasting. Since then, as an entrepreneur in media and Internet, he has created a TV station, several radio stations, as well as numerous cable and satellite services. His interactive experience began in the mid-1980s with the Minitel and phone services. His first Internet company was created in 1994 as a joint venture with France Telecom.

Bellanger is the author of two books: The Future of Radio (1992) and La convergence, c'est le code (2003). In 2006, the French Ministry of Culture and Communication named him to the Counsel for Strategic Analysis of Cultural and Communications Industries.

In 2004, Bellanger helped to spearhead the French government's introduction of the Dispositif Alerte-Enlèvement, modeled on the North American AMBER Alert systems.

Bibliography 
 Pierre Bellanger : La radio du futur : Les sept défis de la radio commerciale en France, Armand Colin, (1992)
 Pierre Bellanger : Ils ont pensé le futur : web social, marketing, e-commerce..., KAWA
 Pierre Bellanger : La Souveraineté numérique, Éditions Stock

References

External links
 Pierre Bellanger on Social Networks

1958 births
French businesspeople
French people of Polish descent
French people of Hungarian descent
Living people